The Batanic languages (sometimes also called Bashiic or Ivatanic) are a dialect cluster of the Austronesian language family. They are spoken on Babuyan Island, just north of Luzon; three of the Batanes Islands, between the Philippines and Taiwan; and on Orchid Island of southern Taiwan.

The varieties in the Philippines are called Ivatan (also spelled Ibatan), or are named Babuyan, Batan, or Itbayat after their islands, while the variety of Taiwan is called Yami or Tao.

Proto-Batanic has been reconstructed by Yang (2002).

Classification
Malcolm Ross (2005) and Roger Blench (2015) list four languages:
Yami (or Tao) on Orchid Island
Imurud dialect
Iraralay dialect
Iranumilek dialect
Itbayat on Itbayat Island
Ivatan
Ivasay dialect (= Basco Ivatan) on Batan
Isamurung dialect (=Southern Ivatan) on Batan (southern part), Sabtang
Ibatan (or Babuyan) on the Babuyan Islands

Moriguchi (1983) classifies the Batanic languages as follows.
Proto-Vasayic
Itbayaten
Vasay
(branch)
Babuyan, Isamorong
Yami: Iraralay, Imorod

According to Paul Jen-kuei Li (2000), Yami is most closely related to Itbayat. Among the Batanic languages, Iraralay is the most conservative.

The Batanic languages are frequently included with the Philippine languages. However, there is no full consensus on this, and some consider them a primary branch of the Malayo-Polynesian languages. Blench concludes that Batanic languages have been splitting from Proto-Malayo-Polynesian for a long time and contain many roots which are not standard Austronesian. The relationship between Batanic and Northern Luzon languages is still uncertain.

References

Further reading

External links
 Bashiic languages at Ethnologue (23rd ed., 2020).

 
Philippine languages